Katie Wall is an Australian actress who has appeared in various television and film roles.

Filmography

Film

Television

External links
 
  Katie Wall at Channel Nine's Underbelly Site
  Katie Wall's first novel will be published by Scribe in May 2010

AACTA Award winners
Australian film actresses
Living people
Australian television actresses
20th-century Australian actresses
21st-century Australian actresses
Year of birth missing (living people)